Ryan Vermeer (born January 11, 1978) is an American professional golfer.

Vermeer was born in Spencer, Iowa. He played college golf at the University of Kansas from 1997 to 2000 where he won a record seven events and was All-American in 1999 and 2000. He turned professional in 2000.

Vermeer played on the Buy.com Tour (now Korn Ferry Tour) in 2001. His best finish was T-18 at the Buy.com Omaha Classic. He finished 163rd on the money list, lost his card and only played sporadically on the Web.com Tour and PGA Tour after 2001.

Vermeer became a club professional and played well enough in the PGA Professional Championship to earn spots in the PGA Championship in 2017, 2018, 2019, 2020 and 2022.

Vermeer won the 2018 PGA Professional Championship. He was the first Nebraska PGA member to win the tournament.

Vermeer made the cut at the 2019 PGA Championship, the third major he played in his career. He finished T80.

Professional wins
2013 National Car Rental PGA Assistant Championship – Nebraska Section
2014 Nebraska Section PGA Match Play Championship, Mizuno Pro/Assistant Championship
2016 Nebraska PGA Championship, Mizuno Pro/Assistant Championship
2017 Nebraska Section PGA Match Play Championship, Mizuno Pro/Assistant Championship
2018 Nebraska Section PGA Match Play Championship, PGA Professional Championship, Nebraska PGA Championship
2019 TaylorMade National Championship, Nebraska PGA Championship
2020 Nebraska PGA Championship
2021 Nebraska PGA Championship
2022 Nebraska PGA Championship

Source:

Results in major championships

CUT = missed the half-way cut
"T" = tied
Note: Vermeer only played in the PGA Championship and the U.S. Open.

U.S. national team appearances
PGA Cup: 2019 (winners), 2022 (winners)

References

External links
 
 

American male golfers
Kansas Jayhawks men's golfers
Golfers from Iowa
People from Spencer, Iowa
1978 births
Living people